Claudio Daniel Husaín (born 20 November 1974) is an Argentine former professional footballer who played as a midfielder.

Husaín played for Vélez Sársfield and River Plate in Argentina, Italian S.S.C. Napoli and Mexican Tigres de la UANL before returning to Argentina to Newell's Old Boys.

Club career

Parma, Napoli and River Plate
In 2000, Husaín was signed by Parma, with Mayer Candelo going the other way.

But the club had unpaid debt of Hernán Crespo's transfer fees to River Plate (the 10% clause of future transfer revenue), he was loaned to River Plate along with Ariel Ortega, who was sold outright for 11 billion lire.

On 27 October 2000, he moved back to Italy to play for Napoli, later revealed as a temporary deal. Despite Napoli relegated, in June 2001 Parma sold him for 21.9 billion lire (around €11.3 million).  

Husaín remained at Naples but in January 2002 left for River Plate on loan. He played another half Serie B season at Napoli before returned to River Plate again in January 2003. It was reported that Napoli had a debt of US$1.2million to River Plate, and allowed Husaín to join River Plate for US$300,000 to compensate the debt and to save salary cost. He was injured in June 2003.

Tigres UANL
In July 2004, he left for Mexican side Tigres UANL.

Newell's Old Boys
Husaín joined Newell's Old Boys in July 2004. After a half season at San Lorenzo, Husaín returned to Newell's Old Boys again on one-year loan in January 2007.

Defensor Sporting 
In August 2009, he was signed by Uruguayan side Defensor Sporting.

Audax Italiano
In January 2010 Husaín signed for Chilean club Audax Italiano, but after the February 27 earthquake he decided to leave the team, which effectively put an end to his career.

International career
Husaín represented Argentina at the 2002 FIFA World Cup. He also played at the 1997 Copa América and the 1999 Copa América.

International goals

Personal life
His brother Darío Husaín is also a professional football player.

He was nicknamed El Turco ("The Turk") because of his Lebanese and Syrian descent. In South America, people of Arab descent are traditionally called "Turks" since their ancestors came to the continent with Ottoman documents in the 1900s.

Honours
Husaín has won six Primera Division Argentina titles, three with Vélez and another three with River Plate. He has also won five international titles (although four of them were from one-off games).

Club
Vélez Sársfield
Argentine Primera División: 1993 (Clausura), 1995 (Apertura), 1996 (Clausura), 1998 (Clausura)
Copa Libertadores: 1994
Copa Intercontinental: 1994
Supercopa Sudamericana: 1996
Copa Interamericana: 1994
Recopa Sudamericana: Runner-up 1995, 1997

River Plate
Argentine Primera División: 2002 (Clausura), 2003 (Clausura), 2004 (Clausura)

International
Argentina
South American Under-17 Football Championship: Third place 1991
FIFA U-17 World Cup: Third place 1991
Pan American Games: Gold Medalist 1995

Footnotes

References

External links
 
 
 

1974 births
Living people
People from La Matanza Partido
Argentine footballers
Argentine expatriate footballers
Argentina international footballers
Argentine people of Lebanese descent
Argentine people of Syrian descent
Sportspeople of Lebanese descent
1997 Copa América players
1999 Copa América players
2002 FIFA World Cup players
Argentine Primera División players
Serie A players
Serie B players
Liga MX players
Uruguayan Primera División players
Chilean Primera División players
Club Atlético Vélez Sarsfield footballers
Club Atlético River Plate footballers
S.S.C. Napoli players
Newell's Old Boys footballers
San Lorenzo de Almagro footballers
Tigres UANL footballers
Defensor Sporting players
Audax Italiano footballers
Expatriate footballers in Italy
Expatriate footballers in Mexico
Expatriate footballers in Uruguay
Expatriate footballers in Chile
Association football midfielders
Argentine expatriate sportspeople in Italy
Argentine expatriate sportspeople in Mexico
Argentina youth international footballers
Pan American Games medalists in football
Pan American Games gold medalists for Argentina
Footballers at the 1995 Pan American Games
Medalists at the 1995 Pan American Games
Sportspeople from Buenos Aires Province